Elena Zagorskaya (born 10 June 1943) is a singer and performer of Russian folk songs, romances, and pop songs.

Biography
Zagorskaya was born in Šmatai, Lithuania on 10 June 1943.

Zagorskaya was a laureate of the 8th World Festival of Youth and Students for the song "Verila, verila, veryu". It was there, she met Muslim Magomayev and went to Italy to continue her singing career.

On 27 August 1967, while in Italy, on the road between Forlì and Milan, Zagorskaya and Anna German were involved in a severe car accident. At high speed, the car driven by Renato Serio crashed into a concrete fence. German was thrown from the car through the windshield and suffered multiple fractures and other internal injuries. An investigation revealed that Serio fell asleep at the wheel. In aftermath, Serio received only a fracture of the hand and foot. Zagorskaya herself suffered some scratches but was not seriously injured.

In 1968, Zagorskaya returned to the Soviet Union. From 1970 to 1989, She was a soloist of Gosconcert. She was awarded the title Honored Artist of the RSFSR (1973).

Personal life
Zagorskaya has two children and lives in Vilnius.

Notes

References 

1943 births
Living people
People from Jonava District Municipality
20th-century Lithuanian women singers
21st-century Lithuanian women singers
Soviet women singers